The 1921 Vanderbilt Commodores baseball team represented the Vanderbilt Commodores of Vanderbilt University in the 1921 NCAA baseball season, winning the SIAA championship. By May 29, the team had hit over .225 for the season, garnering 27 home runs, 17 triples, 26 doubles, 107 singles, and a total of 138 hits for 326 bases with 54 stolen bases.

The Commodores were coached by Byrd Douglas,  Vanderbilt alumnus, once a star catcher of the Princeton baseball team. The yearbook claimed the season's success was "due almost entirely to one man", namely Douglas.

The 1921 Vanderbilt Commodores football team also won an SIAA title.  Frank Godchaux, Doc Kuhn, Tot McCullough, Jess Neely, and Tom Ryan were also members of the football team.

Regular season
Vanderbilt's yearbook The Commodore states that in a 1921 game against Southwestern Presbyterian University, the team achieved a world record in scoring 13 runs in one inning, after two men were out. The Tennessean recalls the event: "Neely singled as did Kuhn; Neil fanned but Thomas got his third straight hit and both tallied. Big Tot got hit by a pitched ball and Smith was safe on a fielder's choice with one out. Woodruf flied out to right. Tyner slammed one to center which Jetty juggled and everybody advanced a pair of sacks. Ryan was safe on another error and two runs came over. Neely beat out his second hit of the inning and Kuhn walked. Neil walked. Thomas was safe on an error and Big Tot McCullough picked one over the right field fence, clearing the sacks--but oh, what's the use? Why continue?" Joe Smith hit a grand slam as well, and Manning Brown got a homer.

In the game against Camp Benning (GA), Neill netted a home run with a fly ball to left field, which bounced off the outfielder's knee for a home run.

The Kentucky game on May 17 and the Princeton game both went into extra innings.

From June 6 to June 15 the Commodores had an Eastern trip carrying them through Kentucky, West Virginia, Delaware, Pennsylvania, New Jersey, and New York. Kuhn starred in the 3 to 2 loss to Princeton.

Schedule/Results

Schedule and results

Roster

Coaches

Players

Statistical leaders

Postseason awards and honors
Shortstop Doc Kuhn and outfielders Manning Brown and Tot McCullough made All-Southern.

References

Vanderbilt Commodores
Vanderbilt Commodores baseball seasons
1921 in sports in Tennessee
Southern Intercollegiate Athletic Association baseball champion seasons